Harlei de Menezes Silva or simply Harlei (born March 30, 1972 in Belo Horizonte), is a retired Brazilian goalkeeper. He played most of his career for Goiás.

Harlei has also reached the milestone of 600 games for Goiás and has helped them avoid relegation in the 2007 season by just 1 point after defeating Internacional 2–1 on the final day.

On 11 December 2014, Harlei retired, becoming Goiás' new director of football.

Honours
Goiás
Brazilian League (2nd division): 1999, 2012
Brazilian Center-West Cup: 2000, 2001, 2002
Goiás State League: 2000, 2002, 2003, 2006, 2009, 2012, 2013

References

External links
 CBF
 sambafoot
 Guardian Stats Centre
 zerozero.pt
 globoesporte
  goiasesporteclube.com

1972 births
Living people
Footballers from Belo Horizonte
Brazilian footballers
Campeonato Brasileiro Série A players
Campeonato Brasileiro Série B players
Cruzeiro Esporte Clube players
Comercial Futebol Clube (Ribeirão Preto) players
Vila Nova Futebol Clube players
Goiás Esporte Clube players
Association football goalkeepers